× Odontobrassia, abbreviated Odbrs. in the horticultural trade, is the nothogenus comprising intergeneric hybrids between the orchid genera Brassia and Odontoglossum (Brs. x Odm.).

References

Orchid nothogenera
Oncidiinae
Historically recognized angiosperm taxa